Rushed is a 2021 American mystery thriller drama film directed by Vibeke Muasya and starring Siobhan Fallon Hogan (who also wrote the screenplay and co-produced the film) and Robert Patrick.

Plot
Barbara O’Brien, an Irish-Catholic mother in Upstate New York. Barbara’s life is upended when her son Jimmy, a college freshman, is involved in a fraternity hazing incident. Barbara resorts to extreme measures when she encounters empty promises in Washington, D.C.

Cast
 Siobhan Fallon Hogan as Barbara O'Brien
 Robert Patrick as Jim O'Brien
 Jake Weary as Steven Croission
 Jay Jay Warren as Jimmy O'Brien
 Justin Linville as Vergil
 Peri Gilpin as Mrs. Donohue
 Brian O'Halloran as Parish Priest

Production
Fallon Hogan was inspired to write the film and give herself a lead role after initially thinking about doing another one-woman show. Scenes were shot in Hogan's home in New Jersey. The last two days of filming occurred in Central New York. Ellen Cleghorne filmed scenes as the school principal, but they were cut.

Release
It was announced that Vertical Entertainment acquired North American distribution rights to the film in June 2021. The film was released in select theaters on August 27, 2021.

Reception
The film has an 90% rating on Rotten Tomatoes based on 10 reviews.

Andrew Stover of Film Threat gave the film a seven out of 10 and wrote, "All in all, this is a well-acted thriller that is surprising and sensible."

Valerie Kalfrin of the Alliance of Women Film Journalists wrote, "Hogan infuses Barbara with such lived-in certainty that her performance is the strongest reason to watch Rushed. Unfortunately, she and co-star Robert Patrick, as Barbara’s husband, Jim, are mired in a story that feels too familiar, if not dated."

Peter Gray of The AU Review wrote: "Rushed is a tender, yet furious drama about the hazing ritual culture of American fraternities."

References

External links
 
 

2021 films
2021 crime drama films
2021 independent films
2021 thriller drama films
American crime drama films
American independent films
American thriller drama films
Films about fraternities and sororities
Films shot in New Jersey
Films shot in New York (state)
Films about mother–son relationships
Vertical Entertainment films
2020s English-language films
2020s American films